Tardamu Airport  is an airport located in Sabu Island, Sabu Raijua Regency, East Nusa Tenggara. Due to the short runway, it is only served by Cessna 264: Caravan jetprop aircraft operated by Sus Air up to twice per day from Kupang, up to five times per week from Waingapu and up to five times per week from Ende, Indonesia.

Airlines and destinations

References

Airports in East Nusa Tenggara